Laža Parish is an administrative unit of South Kurzeme Municipality, Latvia.  The parish has a population of 662 (as of 1/07/2010) and covers an area of 160.1 km2.

Villages of Laža parish 
 Apriķi
 Lanksēži
 Mežgaļi
 Padure (Aizputes Padure)
 Štakeldanga
 Tebras

See also 
 Apriķi Manor

Parishes of Latvia
South Kurzeme Municipality
Courland